A gospel originally meant the Christian message, but in the 2nd century it came to be used also for the books in which the message was set out.

Gospel may also refer to:

 The gospel or "good news" of the imminent coming of the Kingdom of God
 Gospel (liturgy), readings from the Gospels in liturgical use
 Matins Gospel, readings from the Gospels at Matins in the Eastern Churches

Books
 Aradia, or the Gospel of the Witches, a book supposedly containing the religious beliefs of pagan witches
 Gospel: a novel, by Wilton Barnhardt

Film and TV
 The Gospel (film), a 2005 film

Games
 Gospel, the Japanese name of Treble, a dog in the Mega Man video game series
 Gospel, the English name of the final boss of the video game Mega Man Battle Network 2

Music
 Gospel music
 Gospel (band), an American hardcore punk band

Albums
 Gospel (Nana Mouskouri album)
 Gospel (Fireworks album), an album by punk band Fireworks
 Gospel (Mica Paris album), 2020 album by Mica Paris
 Gospel, an album by The Marshall Tucker Band
 Gospel, an album by Polish band Lao Che
 The Gospel Album, an ARIA Award-winning album by Geoffrey Gurrumul Yunupingu, 2015

Songs
 "Gospel", a song by The Chevin from the 2012 album Borderline
 "Gospel", a song by Robbie Williams from the 2012 album Take the Crown
 "The Gospel", a song by Alicia Keys from the 2016 album Here
 "Gospel", a song by Rich Chigga, Keith Ape, and XXXTentacion
 "This Is Gospel", a song by Panic! at the Disco from the 2013 album Too Weird to Live, Too Rare to Die!

See also 
 Godspell, a musical composed by Stephen Schwartz with the book by John-Michael Tebelak